Herbert A. Tulatz (21 June 1914 – 28 June 1968) was a German trade unionist and anti-Nazi activist.

Born in Breslau, Tulatz became a bank clerk, also joining the Social Democratic Party and becoming active in the trade union movement.  He continued working for the movement after it was banned by the Nazis.  In 1936, he was arrested by the Gestapo, and spent the next three-and-a-half years in prisons and labour camps.  On release, he found work with a publishing house, but in 1942 was then conscripted into the 999th Light Afrika Division, a penal battalion.  He was captured by the American forces in Tunisia in 1943 and spent two-and-a-half years as a prisoner-of-war.  For much of this period, he was in Fort Devens with other anti-Nazi activists, and became the camp spokesman.

After World War II, Tulatz returned to publishing work, then began working for the German Trade Union Confederation.  In 1952, he became the director of the confederation's trade union training college, in Oberursel.  In 1959, he went to Nigeria, on a fact-finding mission for the International Labour Organization.  In 1961, he began working for the International Confederation of Free Trade Unions, as its Assistant General Secretary, with responsibility for education.  In 1967, he organised the first ICFTU World Congress on Education, in Montreal.  He died, still in office, in 1968.

References

1914 births
1968 deaths
German Army personnel of World War II
German resistance members
German trade unionists
People from Wrocław
German prisoners of war in World War II held by the United States